The Bridges Library System is a consortium of 24 public libraries in Waukesha County, Wisconsin and Jefferson County, Wisconsin. The Bridges Library System is one of 16 public library systems in Wisconsin. The system was established under Wisconsin Statute 43.15 by action of the Waukesha County Board of Supervisors in January 1981 as the Waukesha County Federated Library System. The system transitioned to a two-county system on January 1, 2016, when Jefferson County joined and the name was changed to Bridges Library System.  An eleven-member board governs the System.

Mission Statement 
Improving member libraries through leadership, collaboration, and support.

Member Libraries 
The Bridges Library System serves the following libraries:

Waukesha County

Big Bend
Brookfield
Butler
Delafield 
Alice Baker Memorial Library (Eagle)
Elm Grove
Hartland
Menomonee Falls
Town Hall Library (North Lake/Merton)
Mukwonago
Muskego
New Berlin
Oconomowoc
Pauline Haass Public Library (Sussex)
Pewaukee
Waukesha

Jefferson County

 Dwight Foster Public Library (Fort Atkinson)
 Jefferson
 Johnson Creek
 Karl Junginger Memorial Library (Waterloo)
 L.D. Fargo Public Library (Lake Mills)
 Powers Memorial Library (Palmyra)
 Watertown
 Irvin L. Young Memorial Library (Whitewater)

Services 
Part of the system's mission is to seek opportunities to maximize resources, leverage buying power, and share costs for member libraries. To that end, services to member libraries include inter-library exchange of materials, coordination of youth services and inclusive services, the foundation of the Library Memory Project, library material delivery services, automation, continuing education, marketing, and more.

References

External links

The Library Memory Project

County library systems in Wisconsin
Public libraries in Wisconsin
Education in Waukesha County, Wisconsin